David Melvin English (October 12, 1942 – February 23, 1995) better known by the stage name Melvin Franklin, or his nickname "Blue", was an American bass singer. Franklin was best known for his role as a founding member of Motown singing group The Temptations from 1960 to 1994.

Early life and career
David English was born in Montgomery, Alabama to Rose English, a teenage mother from nearby Mobile. His biological father was the preacher of the English family's church in Mobile; he impregnated her through rape. Following David's birth, Rose English married Willard Franklin and moved to Detroit, her grandmother insisting young David be left behind in her care. David English finally moved to Detroit with his mother and stepfather in 1952 at age ten.

Taking on his stepfather's surname for his stage name as a teenager, David English—now Melvin Franklin—was a member of a number of local singing groups in Detroit, including The Voice Masters with Lamont Dozier and David Ruffin, and frequently performed with  Richard Street. Franklin often referred to Street and Ruffin as his "cousins".

In 1958, a classmate of Franklin's at Detroit's Northwestern High School, Otis Williams, invited Franklin to join his singing group, Otis Williams and the Siberians. Franklin joined the group as its bass singer, and remained with Williams and Elbridge Bryant when they, Paul Williams, and Eddie Kendricks formed The Elgins in late 1960. In March 1961, the Elgins signed with Motown Records under a new name; The Temptations. He had a fondness for the color blue, and so he was nicknamed "Blue" by fellow singers. According to Otis Williams, Franklin romantically pursued Supremes singer Mary Wilson at one point.

Otis and Melvin were the only founding Temptations who never left the group. One of the most famous bass singers in music over his long career, Franklin's deep vocals became one of the group's signature trademarks. Franklin sang a handful of featured leads with the group as well, including the songs "I Truly, Truly Believe" (The Temptations Wish It Would Rain, 1968), "Silent Night" (Give Love At Christmas, 1980), "The Prophet" (A Song for You, 1975), and his signature live performance number, "Ol' Man River".  Franklin was usually called upon to deliver ad-libs, harmony vocals, and, during the psychedelic soul era, notable sections of the main verses. His line from The Temptations' 1970 #3 hit "Ball of Confusion (That's What the World Is Today)", "and the band played on", became Franklin's trademark.

Health problems and death
In the late 1960s, Franklin was diagnosed with rheumatoid arthritis, the symptoms of which he combated with cortisone so that he could continue performing. The constant use of cortisone left his immune system open to other infections and health problems; as a result Franklin developed diabetes in the early 1980s and later contracted necrotizing fasciitis. In 1978, he was shot in the hand and leg while trying to stop a man from stealing his car in Los Angeles. The incident prevented Franklin from participating in the Temptations' upcoming tour of Poland, which at the time was still behind the Iron Curtain.

On February 15, 1995, after a series of seizures, Franklin fell into a coma and remained unconscious until his death on February 23, 1995.

He is interred at Forest Lawn Memorial Park (Hollywood Hills), Los Angeles.

Other work and honors
In addition to singing, Franklin also worked as a voice actor. In 1984, he provided the voice for the character of "Wheels" in the animated series Pole Position. He also appeared in the movie Sky Bandits in 1986.

In 1989, Franklin was inducted into the Rock and Roll Hall of Fame as a member of The Temptations.
On August 17, 2013, in Cleveland, Ohio, Melvin Franklin was inducted into the Rhythm and Blues Music Hall of Fame as a member of The Temptations. On February 9, 2013, his wife received the lifetime achievement award on his behalf.

In popular culture
In 1998, NBC aired The Temptations, a four-hour television miniseries based upon an autobiographical book by Otis Williams. Franklin was portrayed by actor D. B. Woodside.

References

Further reading
 Melvin Franklin in-depth interview by Pete Lewis, 'Blues & Soul' October 1992 (reprinted February 2009)

External links

1942 births
1995 deaths
African-American male singers
American basses
American soul musicians
American male voice actors
American shooting survivors
Burials at Forest Lawn Memorial Park (Hollywood Hills)
Musicians from Detroit
Musicians from Montgomery, Alabama
The Temptations members
20th-century American male actors
20th-century American singers
American male dancers
Songwriters from Alabama
Dancers from Alabama
American rhythm and blues singers
American soul singers
Northwestern High School (Michigan) alumni
African-American songwriters
20th-century American male singers